This is a list of notable packing houses.  A packing house is a building where fruits, oysters, or other items are packed for shipping and distribution and there exist thousands of them in agricultural areas.

in England
The main purpose of packing warehouses in England was the picking, checking, labelling and packing of goods for export. The packing warehouses: Asia House, India House and Velvet House along Whitworth Street in Manchester were some of the tallest buildings of their time.

in the United States
A number of historically significant packing houses in the United States are listed on the U.S. National Register of Historic Places.

Notable packing houses include:
J.C. Rhew Co. Packing Shed, Providence, Arkansas, NRHP-listed
Anaheim Packing House, Anaheim, California
Elephant Packing House, Fullerton, California, NRHP-listed
Frances Packing House, Irvine, California, NRHP-listed
New York Belting and Packing Co., Newtown, Connecticut, NRHP-listed
Strawn Historic Citrus Packing House District, DeLeon Springs, Florida, NRHP-listed
N. G. Arfaras Sponge Packing House, Tarpon Springs, Florida, NRHP-listed
E. R. Meres Sponge Packing House, Tarpon Springs, Florida, NRHP-listed
Auburndale Citrus Growers Association Packing House, Auburndale, Florida, NRHP-listed
Marion S. Whaley Citrus Packing House, Rockledge, Florida, NRHP-listed
J. C. Palumbo Fruit Company Packing Warehouse Building, Payette, Idaho, NRHP-listed
Midland Packing Company, Sioux City, Iowa, NRHP-listed
Rath Packing Company Administration Building, Waterloo, Iowa, NRHP-listed
Portland Packing Company Factory, Portland, Maine, NRHP-listed
J. C. Lore Oyster House, Maryland, NRHP-listed
Mississippi Mills Packing and Shipping Rooms, Wesson, Mississippi, NRHP-listed
Bivalve Oyster Packing Houses and Docks, Bivalve, New Jersey, NRHP-listed
Rudolph Oyster House, West Sayville, New York, NRHP-listed
De Mores Packing Plant Ruins, Medora, North Dakota, NRHP-listed
Union Fishermen's Cooperative Packing Company Alderbrook Station, Astoria, Oregon, NRHP-listed
Seacoast Packing Company, Beaufort, South Carolina, NRHP-listed
The Corner Packing Shed, Frogmore, South Carolina, NRHP-listed
Earle R. Taylor House and Peach Packing Shed, Greer, South Carolina, NRHP-listed
Mission Citrus Growers Union Packing Shed, Mission, Texas, NRHP-listed
Mukai Cold Process Fruit Barrelling Plant, Vashon, Washington, NRHP-listed
Peter Myers Pork Packing Plant and Willard Coleman Building, Janesville, Wisconsin, NRHP-listed

References

Further reading
The Story of the Bale. Manchester: Lloyd's Packing Warehouses Ltd, Princess Street, 1926

Packing houses